William F. Tammany (1873–1951) was a one term Republican mayor of South Norwalk, Connecticut from 1911 to 1912.

He was the senior partner of the Tammany and Connery law firm on Washington Street.

In 1901, he was the prosecuting attorney for the city of Norwalk.

In 1911, he was appointed a judge of the Town Court of Norwalk.

In 1916, he was counsel for the plaintiff in the case Savings Bank of Danbury v. Loewe [242 U.S. 357 (1917)] which was heard by the Supreme Court. The case was argued on December 11, 1916, and decided on January 8, 1917.

In 1922, he was Corporation Counsel of the city of Norwalk.

In 1950, he was president of South Norwalk Savings Bank.

References 

1873 births
1951 deaths
Connecticut lawyers
Connecticut Republicans
Mayors of Norwalk, Connecticut
Municipal judges in the United States